Ken Jordan may refer to:

 Ken Jordan (American football) (born 1964), former linebacker in the National Football League
 Ken Jordan (basketball) (1912–1994), American professional basketball player
 Ken Jordan (musician), American electronic musician with The Crystal Method